Railroad directions are used to describe train directions on rail systems. The terms used may be derived from such sources as compass directions, altitude directions, or other directions. However, the railroad directions frequently vary from the actual directions, so that, for example, a "northbound" train may really be headed west over some segments of its trip, or a train going "down" may actually be increasing its elevation. Railroad directions are often specific to system, country, or region.

Radial directions
Many rail systems use the concept of a center (usually a major city) to define rail directions.

Up and down
In British practice, railway directions are usually described as "up" and "down", with "up" being towards a major location. This convention is applied not only to the trains and the tracks, but also to items of lineside equipment and to areas near a track. Since British trains run on the left, the "up" side of a line is usually on the left when proceeding in the "up" direction.

On most of the network, "up" is the direction towards London. In most of Scotland, with the exception of the West and East Coast Main Lines , and the Borders Railway, "up" is towards Edinburgh. The Valley Lines network around Cardiff has its own peculiar usage, relating to the literal meaning of traveling "up" and "down" the valley. On the former Midland Railway "up" was towards Derby. On the Northern Ireland Railways network, "up" generally means toward Belfast (the specific zero milepost varying from line to line); except for cross-border services to Dublin, where Belfast is "down". Mileposts normally increase in the "down" direction, but there are exceptions, such as the Trowbridge line between Bathampton Junction and Hawkeridge Junction, where mileage increases in the "up" direction.
 
Individual tracks will have their own names, such as Up Main or Down Loop. Trains running towards London are normally referred to as "up" trains, and those away from London as "down".

In China, railway directions with terminus in Beijing are described as "up" (shàngxíng) and "down" (xiàxíng), with up towards Beijing; trains leaving Beijing are "down", while those going toward Beijing are "up". Trains run through Beijing may have two or more numbers, for example, the train from Harbin to Shanghai K58/55 uses two different numbers: on the Harbin–Tianjin section, the train runs toward Beijing, the train is known as K58, but on the Tianjin–Shanghai section, the train is known as K55; the opposite train from Shanghai to Harbin is known as K56/57, while K56 is used from Shanghai to Tianjin and K57 is used from Tianjin to Harbin. Generally even numbers denote trains heading towards Beijing while odd numbers are those heading away from the capital.

For JR Group trains, trains going towards the capital Tokyo are "up" trains, while those going away from the capital are "down" trains. For private railway operators, the designation of "up" or "down" (if at all) usually relies on where the company is headquartered as "up".

In Hong Kong, most lines have their "down" direction towards the terminal closer to Central, with the exception of Disneyland Resort line, where the down line is towards Disneyland to be consistent with Tung Chung line where it branches from. On Tuen Ma line, the "down" end is Wu Kai Sha. The up/down direction was switched in the former Ma On Shan line such that it could be connected with the former West Rail line. The direction is signposted along the track, with the mileage increasing in the up direction, and also on the platform ends.

The railway systems of the Australian states have generally followed the practices of railways in the United Kingdom. Railway directions are usually described as "up" and "down", with "up" being towards the major location in most states, which is usually the capital city of the state. For example, in New South Wales, trains running away from Sydney are "down" trains, while in Victoria, trains running away from Melbourne are "down" trains. An interstate train travelling from Sydney to Melbourne is a "down" train until it crosses the state border at Albury, where it changes its classification to an "up" train. Even in states that follow this practice, exceptions exist for individual lines. In the state of Queensland, "up" and "down" directions are individually defined for each line. Therefore, a train heading towards the main railway station in Brisbane (Roma Street station) would be classified as an "up" train on some lines but as a "down" train on other lines.

In Taiwan, trains travelling north towards Keelung on the west-coast Main Line and towards Badu on the Yilan Line are considered "up" trains.  However, on other parts of the network, the terminology "clockwise" and "counter-clockwise" are used instead.

Inbound and outbound
In many commuter rail and rapid transit services in the United States, the rail directions are related to the location of the city center. The term inbound is used for the direction leading in toward the city center and outbound is used for the opposite direction leading out of the city center.

City name directions
Some British rail directions commonly used are London and Country. The London end of a station is the end where trains to London depart. The country end is the opposite end, where trains to the country depart. This usage is problematic where more than one route to London exists (e.g. at Exeter St Davids, or Edinburgh Waverley).

Even and odd
In France, railway directions are usually described as Pair and Impair (meaning Even and Odd), corresponding to Up and Down in the British system. Pair means heading toward Paris, and Impair means heading away from Paris. This convention is applied not only to the trains and the tracks, but also to items of lineside equipment. Pair is also quasi-homophonic with Paris, so direction P is equivalent either with direction Pair or with direction Paris.

A similar system is in use in Italy, where directions can be Pari or Dispari (Even and Odd respectively). Pari (Even) trains conventionally travel north- and west-bound. The city of Paris is referenced in colloquial use (Parigi in Italian), with Pari trains virtually leading towards it (Paris being in a north-western direction from any point in Italy).

In Russia (and ex-USSR countries), the "even direction" is usually north- and eastbound, while the "odd direction" is south- and westbound. Trains traveling "even" and "odd" usually receive even and odd numbers as well as track and signal numbers, respectively.

Circumferential directions
In double track loop lines – such as those encircling a city – the tracks, trains and trackside equipment can be identified by their relative distance from the center of the loop. Inner refers to the track and its trains that are closer to the geographic center. Outer refers to the track and its trains that are furthermost from the geographic center. One example is the City Circle line in the Sydney Trains system.

For circle routes, the directions may indicate clockwise or counterclockwise (anti-clockwise) bound trains. For example, on the Circle line of London Underground or the loop of the Central line, the directions are often referred to as "inner rail" (anti-clockwise) or "outer rail" (clockwise).

Geographical directions

Cardinal directions
Most railroads in the United States use nominal cardinal directions for the directions of their lines, which often differ from actual compass directions. These directions are often referred to as "railroad" north, south, east, or west, to avoid confusion with the compass directions.

Typically an entire railroad system (the lines of a railroad or a related group of railroads) will describe all of its lines by only two directions, either east and west, or north and south. This greatly reduces the possibility of misunderstanding the direction in which a train is travelling as it traverses lines which may twist and turn or even reverse direction for a distance. These directions also have significance in resolving conflicts between trains running in opposite directions. For example, many railroads specify that trains of equal class running to the east are superior to those running west. This means that, if two trains are approaching a passing siding on a single-track line, the inferior westbound train must "take the siding" and wait there for the superior eastbound train to pass.

In the United States, most railroads use "east and west", and it is unusual for a railroad to designate "north and south" (the New York City Subway, the Chicago "L", and the Washington Metro are rare examples). Even-numbered trains (superior) travel east (or north). Odd-numbered trains (inferior) travel west (or south).

On the London Underground, geographic direction naming generally prevails (e.g. eastbound, westbound) except for the Circle line where it is Outer Rail and Inner Rail.

Other names for north and south
In New York City, the terms uptown and downtown are used in the subway to refer to northbound and southbound respectively. The nominal railroad direction is determined by how the line will travel when it enters Manhattan.

For railways in China that are not connected with Beijing, north and west are used as "up", and east and south as "down". Odd numbered train codes are used for "down" trains, while even numbers are used for "up"; for example, train T27 from Beijing West to Lhasa is "down" (going away from Beijing) since 27 is odd.

References

Rail transport operations
Orientation (geometry)